Pulido may refer to
 Pulido (surname)
Pulido River, a river of Chile
Hospital Pulido Valente in Lisbon, Portugal
Jorge Enrique Pulido TV, a defunct Colombian TV program